Makindye Division is one of the five administrative divisions of Kampala, the capital of Uganda, and the largest city in that country. The city's five divisions are: (a) Kampala Central Division (b) Kawempe Division (c) Lubaga Division (d) Makindye Division and (e) Nakawa Division.

Location
Makindye Division is in the southeastern corner of the city, bordering Wakiso District to the south and west. The eastern boundary of the division is Murchison Bay, a part of Lake Victoria. Nakawa Division lies to the northeast of Makindye Division. Kampala Central Division lies to the north and Lubaga Division lies to the northwest. The coordinates of Makindye Division are:0°17'00.0"N, 32°35'00.0"E (Latitude:0.283334; Longitude:32.583334).

Overview
Neighborhoods in the division include Bukasa, Buziga, Ggaba, Kabalagala, Muyenga, Katwe, Kibuli, Kibuye, Kisugu, Lukuli, Luwafu, Makindye, Munyonyo, Nsambya, Nsambya Police Barracks, Salaama and Wabigalo. The following points of interest are located in Makindye Division:
 Embassy of the United States
 Nsambya Hospital
 Kampala University, Main campus
 Kampala International University, Main campus
 Munyonyo Martyrs Shrine, 
 Cavendish University Uganda
 Headquarters of the Uganda Catholic Secretariat - Nsambya
 Ggaba National Seminary — Roman Catholic
 International Hospital Kampala 
 Little Light Uganda - A non-governmental organization
 Monitor Publications - A subsidiary of Nation Media Group.

See also

References

External links
 Wavamuno Aids Orphans In Makindye Division
 Sex For A Chapatti!
 Google Map of the Makindye Division of Kampala

 
Geography of Kampala
Populated places in Uganda